The American Pomological Society was founded by Marshall Pinckney Wilder in 1848, to foster the growing of fruit and the development of new varieties, and is the oldest fruit organization in North America.

Publications
The organization's primary publication is the Journal of the American Pomological Society. This journal was previously known as the Fruit Varieties Journal. The society also publishes the Register of Fruit and Nut Varieties in cooperation with the American Society for Horticultural Science.

Notable people

Helen Vickroy Austin
Catherine Hayes Bailey
Patrick Barry
Joseph Lancaster Budd
Charles Benedict Calvert
George M. Darrow
Albert Etter
Felix Gillet
Lue Gim Gong
Ulysses Prentiss Hedrick
Arthur B. Howard
John Carmichael Jenkins
Thomas Meehan
Frederick Smyth
Marshall Pinckney Wilder (politician)
Floyd Zaiger

References

Pomology
Horticultural organizations based in the United States
Professional associations based in the United States
Learned societies of the United States
1848 establishments in the United States